The Rocket Mortgage Classic is a professional golf tournament on the PGA Tour. It was first staged in 2019 at Detroit Golf Club  in Detroit, Michigan. The tournament replaced the Quicken Loans National on the PGA Tour schedule. It is the first PGA Tour event in history to be held completely within the Detroit city limits.  For the 2019 season, the event was part of the Open Qualifying Series, giving two non-exempt players entry into The Open Championship.

Winners

References

External links
Coverage on the PGA Tour's official site
Detroit Golf Club

PGA Tour events
Golf in Michigan
Rock Ventures
Recurring sporting events established in 2019